Edward Fawcett may refer to:
 Edward Fawcett (cricketer), British army officer and English cricketer
 Edward Douglas Fawcett, English mountaineer, philosopher and novelist
 M. Edward Fawcett, American bishop